Essential is a compilation album by the punk rock band the Ramones. It was released on July 9, 2007 by Chrysalis. The record is made up of tracks from the group's five albums on the imprint: Brain Drain, Mondo Bizarro, Acid Eaters, ¡Adios Amigos!, and Loco Live.

Track listing 
 "Can't Get You Outta My Mind'"
 "Poison Heart"
 "Scattergun"
 "Come Back Baby"
 "Pinhead (Live)"
 "Chinese Rocks (Live)"
 "Surf City"
 "Rockaway Beach (Live)"
 "Censorshit"
 "Touring"
 "Blitzkrieg Bop (Live)"
 "Sheena Is a Punk Rocker (Live)"
 "Take It As It Comes"
 "It's Not For Me To Know"
 "Pet Sematary"
 "She Talks To Rainbows"
 "I Won't Let It Happen"
 "Surfin' Bird (Live)"
 "Tomorrow She Goes Away"
 "Merry Christmas (I Don't Want To Fight Tonight)"

References

External links
Ramones - Essential CD

2007 compilation albums
Ramones compilation albums